Venus is a summer resort in Romania, on the Black Sea coast,  north of Mangalia.

Mangalia
Venus